Little Beskids Landscape Park (Park Krajobrazowy Beskidu Małego) is a protected area (Landscape Park) in southern Poland, established in 1998, covering an area of . It lies within the Little Beskids mountain range.

The Park is shared between two voivodeships: Silesian and Lesser Poland.

References 

Landscape parks in Poland
Protected areas of the Western Carpathians
Parks in Lesser Poland Voivodeship
Parks in Silesian Voivodeship